Alan Angus McDonald (December 13, 1927 – July 26, 2007) was a United States district judge of the United States District Court for the Eastern District of Washington.

Education and career

Born in Harrah, Washington, McDonald  received a Bachelor of Science degree from the University of Washington in 1950 and a Bachelor of Laws from the University of Washington School of Law in 1952. He was a deputy prosecuting attorney of Yakima County, Washington from 1952 to 1954, and was in private practice in Yakima, Washington from 1954 until 1985.

Federal judicial service

On September 11, 1985, McDonald was nominated by President Ronald Reagan to a new seat on the United States District Court for the Eastern District of Washington created by 98 Stat. 333. He was confirmed by the United States Senate on October 16, 1985, and received his commission on October 17, 1985. He assumed senior status on December 13, 1996, serving in that capacity for until his death, in Yakima, on July 26, 2007.

Accusations of racism

McDonald was accused in the Washington media of making racist jokes about people who appeared in his courtroom.  In introducing a House Resolution condemning the actions of Judge McDonald, Rep. John Conyers (MI-D) stated that he had "made or participated in numerous communications that referred to racial, ethic and religious minorities in demeaning, stereotypical and racist language, including references to Latino defendants and lawyers as 'greasers,' an African-Americans plaintiff as 'impo-tent' and maligning Mormons, Jew and Chinese for corrupt financial practices."

References

Sources
 

1927 births
2007 deaths
University of Washington alumni
Judges of the United States District Court for the Eastern District of Washington
United States district court judges appointed by Ronald Reagan
20th-century American judges
University of Washington School of Law alumni